Ukhi Tappeh (also Romanized as Ūkhī Tappeh) is a village in Atrak Rural District, Dashli Borun District, Gonbad-e Qabus County, Golestan Province, Iran. At the 2006 census, its population was 296, in 56 families.

References 

Populated places in Gonbad-e Kavus County